Peek-A-Boo Records is an Austin, Texas based independent record label.

Current (active) bands 
 Peel
 The Octopus Project
 Palaxy Tracks

Alumni (previous bands) 
 The 1-4-5s
 Black Lipstick
 Drake Tungsten
 Golden Millennium
 Junior Varsity
 The Kiss Offs
 Knife in the Water
 The Prima Donnas
 Silver Scooter
 Spoon
 Super XX Man

See also 
 List of record labels

References

External links
 Official site

Indie rock record labels
Alternative rock record labels
American independent record labels
Record labels established in 1995